Willem Scato van Walt Meijer (born 8 July 1958 in Rotterdam) is a sailor from the Netherlands, Since the Netherlands did boycott the Moscow Olympic Games Van Walt Meijer represented his National Olympic Committee at the 1980 Summer Olympics, which was boycotted by several countries, in Tallinn, USSR under the Dutch NOC flag. With Govert Brasser as crew, Van Walt Meijer took the 5th place in the Tornado. Van Walt Meijer returned as crew with Boudewijn Binkhorst in the Star to the 1984 Olympics. There they took 8th place.

Sailing career
Van Walt Meijer started his international sailing career in the Vaurien. Via the 470 he moved to the Tornado. After the 1980 Summer Olympics Van Walt Meijer briefly tried in 1982 the Soling and the Australian 18ft Skiff before he continued his Olympic career in the Star. Nowadays Van Walt Meijer sails on an irregular basis in the Dragon and the Melges 24.

Professional life
Van Walt Meijer studied from 1976 till 1983 on the Groningen University and on the Northwestern University – Kellogg School of Management from 2002 till 2003. After his military service at the Koninklijke Militaire Academie of the Dutch Army Van Walt Meijer held the following positions:
 Unilever 1984–2004
 Marketing & Sales Managers positions at Calvé
 Business Unit Head Foods Indonesia
 Marketing Director Ireland
 Strategy Member Foods Division
 Senior Vice President Foods Central & Eastern Europe
 CEO Russia & Ukraine
 Senior Vice President Frozen Foods
 CEO The Greenery 2004–2005
 Royal Friesland Foods 2005–2008
 Interim manager Central Europe
 CEO Friesland Foods Cheese & Leader Classic Dairy
 CEO Midoceanbrands 2008–2012
 Non-Executive Director & Head of the Audit Committee Milkiland 2010 – Present
 Managing Director International Markets Polyconcept & Polyconcept Hong Kong Ltd. 2013 – Present

Sources
 
 
 
 
 
 
 
 
 
 
 
 
 
 
 
 
 
 
 
 
 
 
 

Living people
1958 births
Sportspeople from Rotterdam
Dutch male sailors (sport)

Sailors at the 1980 Summer Olympics – Tornado
Sailors at the 1984 Summer Olympics – Star
Olympic sailors of the Netherlands